World of Lies, released in 2005,  is the third album by the band The Berzerker.  This release marked a change in the band's sound as the tempo was slower on most tracks.

Track listing
All songs written and arranged by Luke Kenny.

"Committed to Nothing" – 2:39
"Black Heart" – 2:16
"All About You" – 2:41
"Burn the Evil" – 2:30
"World of Tomorrow" – 2:24
"Follow Me" – 2:42
"Y" – 2:57
"As the World Waits" – 3:16
"Afterlife" – 3:20
"Never Hated More" – 3:18
"Free Yourself" – 3:03
"Constant Pain" – 2:25
"Farewell" – 20:08

The thirteenth track, "Silence", is not listed on the back cover of the album and is normally referred to as "............". Rather than the usual way of listing untitled tracks (track number, no song name), the track number is eliminated completely.

Reception

Personnel
 Luke Kenny – producer, vocals, drum programming, synth
 Ed Lacey – guitar, bass
 Jason V. – guitar, bass
 Adrian Naudi – guitar, bass
 Sam Bean – guitar, bass

References

2005 albums
The Berzerker albums
Earache Records albums